L. kimchii may refer to:
 Lactobacillus kimchii, a bacteriocin-producing lactic acid bacterium
 Leuconostoc kimchii, a Gram-positive bacterium in the genus Leuconostoc

See also
 Kimchii